Cletus Josiah "Red" Clinker (January 6, 1911 – January 12, 1979) was an American football player and coach. He served as the head football coach at the University of South Dakota in 1942, compiling a record of 5–3. After one season at the helm, Clinker reported for duty at the U. S. Navy Pre-Flight School in Chapel Hill, North Carolina. He died on January 12, 1979, in Walnut Creek, California.

Head coaching record

College

References

1911 births
1979 deaths
American football quarterbacks
Players of American football from Iowa
South Dakota Coyotes football coaches
South Dakota Coyotes football players
High school football coaches in California
High school football coaches in South Dakota
United States Navy personnel of World War II